Nicholas Hough (born 20 October 1993) is an Australian sprinter and hurdler.

Early years 
In 2011, Hough graduated from The King's School, Parramatta where he was the School Captain. In his HSC, he came equal fifth in the state in Software Development. Hough was an all-rounder, competing in sprints, hurdles, jumps and the shot put.

Hough made his international debut aged 16 at the inaugural 2010 Youth Olympic Games. Two years later he competed at the IAAF World Junior Championships winning silver in the 110m hurdles.

In 2013 Hough ran his lifetime bests in the sprints (10.39/20.66), securing semi-final places at the World University Games. He was then invited to run in the team for the national 4x100m relay at the World Championships.

Achievements 
At the inaugural 2010 Summer Youth Olympics in Singapore, Hough won the 110 metres hurdles in a new personal best of 13.37 seconds. He narrowly edged ahead of Dongqiang Wang of China and Jussi Kanervo of Finland to take the gold medal and become the first ever Youth Olympic Games hurdles champion.

Hough also competed in the Pirtek All-Stars Gatorade Bolt meet at the Sydney Olympic Park Athletic Centre on 15 September 2010.  The event was a promotional visit for the Jamaican Sprint King Usain Bolt, and took place on the 10th anniversary of the Sydney Olympics.  Nick won the David Baxter memorial 100m in a time of 10.62s, half a second quicker than the fastest men in football, Lachie Turner, John Grant and Jarryd Hayne, the fastest of whom clocked 11.10s on the night.

In 2014 he was a member of the Australian Commonwealth Games team, to represent Australia at Glasgow, Scotland. Hough placed 4th in the final of the 110m hurdles, and achieved a personal best. In the 2018 Commonwealth Games, Hough placed 3rd taking the bronze medal and achieved personal best for the Men's 110m hurdles.

Hough qualified for the Tokyo 2020 Olympics. He came third in his Men's 110m hurdles heat with a time of 13:57 and therefore qualified for the semi-final. In the semi-final Hough ran seventh with a time of 13:88, half a second behind the semi-final winner and eventual bronze medallist Ronald Levy from Jamaica.

Hough is currently studying a combined degree of Bachelor of Information Technology and Bachelor of Laws at Sydney University.

Achievements

References

External links

 

1993 births
Living people
Australian male sprinters
Australian male hurdlers
Athletes (track and field) at the 2010 Summer Youth Olympics
World Athletics Championships athletes for Australia
Athletes (track and field) at the 2014 Commonwealth Games
Athletes (track and field) at the 2018 Commonwealth Games
Commonwealth Games medallists in athletics
Commonwealth Games bronze medallists for Australia
Australian Athletics Championships winners
Youth Olympic gold medalists for Australia
Youth Olympic gold medalists in athletics (track and field)
Athletes (track and field) at the 2020 Summer Olympics
Olympic athletes of Australia
21st-century Australian people
Medallists at the 2018 Commonwealth Games